Legenda Tatr is a Polish historical film. It was released in 1995.

References

External links
 

1995 films
Polish historical films
1990s Polish-language films
1990s historical films